is a Japanese light novel series written by Takuma Sakai and illustrated by Asagi Tōsaka. ASCII Media Works have published seven volumes since March 2020 under their Dengeki Bunko imprint. A manga adaptation with art by Minami has been serialized in ASCII Media Works' seinen manga magazine Dengeki Maoh since August 2020. It has been collected in four tankōbon volumes. An anime television series adaptation is set to premiere in 2023.

Characters

Media

Light novel

Manga
A manga adaptation with art by Minami has been serialized in ASCII Media Works' seinen manga magazine Dengeki Maoh since August 2020. It has been collected in four tankōbon volumes as of February 2023.

Anime
On December 11, 2021, during the live-streamed "Dengeki Bunko Winter Festival 2021" event, an anime television series adaptation was announced. It is set to premiere in 2023.

Reception
The light novel series won the gold prize (effectively second place) in the 26th Dengeki Novel Prize in 2019.

See also
 Girly Air Force, another light novel series illustrated by the same illustrator
 The Demon Sword Master of Excalibur Academy, another light novel series illustrated by the same illustrator
 Seiyū Radio no Ura Omote, the winner of the grand prize (effectively first place) of the 26th Dengeki Novel Prize

References

External links
 
 
 

2020 Japanese novels
2023 anime television series debuts
Animated television series about pigs
Anime and manga based on light novels
ASCII Media Works manga
Books about pigs
Comics about pigs
Dengeki Bunko
Isekai anime and manga
Isekai novels and light novels
Kadokawa Dwango franchises
Light novels
Seinen manga
Upcoming anime television series